Rolle Airfield , also known as Rolle Field, formally Yuma Auxiliary Army Airfield No. 4, is a public use non-towered airport owned by United States Department of the Interior, and managed by the Yuma County Airport Authority.

Although most U.S. airports use the same three-letter location identifier for the FAA, IATA, and ICAO, Rolle Airfield is only assigned 44A by the FAA.

History 

In 1942 Yuma Auxiliary Army Airfield No. 4 (aka Rolle Field) was one of seven satellite auxiliary airfields for Yuma Army Air Field (now: Marine Corps Air Station Yuma) and is one of many Arizona World War II Army Airfields. The United States Army Air Forces trained bomber crews at Rolle through the end of World War II. The airport was declared surplus in 1945 and relinquished to the Department of the Interior in 1947. Through the 1950s, 60s, and 70s the airport was used primarily by agricultural farmers and growers for conducting crop dusting operations for the surrounding areas. In 1972 improvements were made to runway 17/35 to what we see today. Additional improvements were completed in 2011 to the airport including reconstruction of 17/35 runway, construction of new taxiway and aircraft parking apron, construction of runway end run-outs, a new parking lot, sidewalk, hangar, septic system, water well, electrical generator, perimeter fence, access vehicle gate and pedestrian gate. With these improvements the Airport Authority hopes to attract an increase in traffic from general aviation as well as companies that specialise in unmanned aerial systems.

In 2009 Yuma County Airport Authority renewed the lease on the airport for 25 years.

Facilities and aircraft 
It has one runway:

 17/35 measuring  asphalt

For the 12-month period ending February 11, 2016, the airport had 3,100 aircraft operations, an average of 8.5 per day: 97% general aviation, and 3% military. At that time there were no aircraft based at this airport.

See also 

 Yuma International Airport
 Arizona World War II Army Airfields
 List of airports in Arizona

References

Further reading
 Manning, Thomas A. (2005), History of Air Education and Training Command, 1942–2002. Office of History and Research, Headquarters, AETC, Randolph AFB, Texas  
 Shaw, Frederick J. (2004), Locating Air Force Base Sites, History’s Legacy, Air Force History and Museums Program, United States Air Force, Washington DC.

External links 
 Rolle Field (44A) at Arizona DOT airport directory
 
 

Airports in Yuma County, Arizona